Douglas Cole may refer to:

 G. D. H. Cole (1889–1959), English historian
 Douglas Cole (historian) (1938–1998), Canadian historian
 Douglas R. Cole (born 1964), American judge
 Douglas Seaman Cole, former Canadian ambassador to Mexico
Douglas Cole, mayor of Largo, Florida
 Doug Cole, footballer